Luigi Guida (Vico Equense 1883–1951) was an Italian composer, both of salon songs, but more particularly sacred music as part of the Cecilian Movement.

Recordings
Mistica songs and solo sacred arias Candida Guida, Eufemia Manfredi CD Nova Antiqua, DDD, 2022

References

External links
 Documentary about: https://www.youtube.com/watch?v=xux2uE_FsFk
 Recording with songs by Luigi Guida: https://www.novantiqua.net/prodotto/Mistica

1883 births
1951 deaths